Kenji-Van Boto (born 7 March 1996) is a professional footballer who plays for Auxerre as a defender. Born in France, he plays for the Madagascar national team.

Club career
Boto began his senior career with Auxerre's reserves in 2014, before promoting to their senior team in 2016. On 17 June 2021, he joined Pau FC on loan.

International career
Boto was born in France and is of Malagasy descent. He is a former youth international with the France U16s. He was called up to the Madagascar national team for a set of friendlies in September 2022. He debuted in a 3–3 friendly tie with Congo on 24 September 2022.

Career statistics

References

External links
 
 
 

1996 births
Living people
Footballers from Réunion
Sportspeople from Saint-Denis, Réunion
Malagasy footballers
French footballers
France youth international footballers
French sportspeople of Malagasy descent
People of Malagasy descent from Réunion
Association football defenders
AJ Auxerre players
Pau FC players
Ligue 1 players
Ligue 2 players
Championnat National 2 players
Championnat National 3 players
Black French sportspeople